Pholisa Makeleni is a South African politician who served as a member of the Western Cape Provincial Legislature from May 2014 to May 2019, representing the opposition African National Congress. She served as a member of the Standing Committee on Cultural Affairs and Sport in the Legislature.

References

Year of birth missing (living people)
Living people
African National Congress politicians
Members of the Western Cape Provincial Parliament
Women members of provincial legislatures of South Africa